National Instruments Corporation, doing business as NI, is an American multinational company with international operation. Headquartered in Austin, Texas, it is a producer of automated test equipment and virtual instrumentation software. Common applications include data acquisition, instrument control and machine vision.

In 2016, the company sold products to more than 35,000 companies with revenues of US$1.23 billion.

History

Founding 
In the early 1970s, James Truchard, Jeff Kodosky, and Bill Nowlin were working at the University of Texas at Austin Applied Research Laboratories. As part of a project conducting research for the U.S. Navy, the men were using early computer technology to collect and analyze data. Frustrated with the inefficient data collection methods they were using, the three decided to create a product that would enable their task to be done more easily. In 1976, working in the garage at Truchard's home, the three founded a new company. They attempted to incorporate under several names, including Longhorn Instruments and Texas Digital, but all were rejected. Finally they settled on the current name of National Instruments.

With a $10,000 loan from Interfirst Bank, the group bought a PDP-11/04 minicomputer and, for their first project, designed and built a GPIB interface for it. Their first sale was the result of a cold call to Kelly Air Force Base in San Antonio. The three were still employed by the University of Texas. In 1977 they hired their first full-time employee, Kim Harrison-Hosen, who handled orders, billing, and customer inquiries. By the end of the year they had sold three boards, and to attract more business, the company produced and sent a mailer to 15,000 users of the PDP-11 minicomputer. As sales increased, they were able to move into a real office space in 1978, occupying a  office at 9513 Burnet Road in Austin.

1980s 
At the end of the 1970s, the company booked $400,000 in orders, recording a $60,000 profit. In 1980 Truchard, Kodosky, and Nowlin quit their jobs to devote themselves full-time to National Instruments, and at the end of the year moved the company to a larger office, renting  of office space. To assist in generating revenue, the company undertook numerous special projects, working on a fuel-pump credit-card system and a waveform generator for U.S. Navy sonar acoustic testing. By 1981, the company reached the $1 million sales mark, leading them to move to a  office in 1982.

In 1983 National Instruments reached an organizational milestone, developing their first GPIB board to connect instruments to IBM PCs. With the arrival of the Macintosh computer, however, the company felt ready to take advantage of the new graphical interfaces.  Kodosky began a research initiative with the assistance of student researchers at the University of Texas into ways to exploit the new interface. This led to the creation of NI's flagship product, the LabVIEW graphical development platform for the Macintosh computer, which was released in 1986. The software allows engineers and scientists to program graphically, by "wiring" icons together instead of typing text-based code. By allowing people to use a more intuitive, less-structured development environment, their productivity greatly increased, making LabVIEW quite popular. The following year, a version of LabVIEW, known as LabWindows, was released for the DOS environment.

The company had 100 employees by 1986. As part of the company's decision to begin direct sales of its products, NI opened its first international branch, in Tokyo in 1987.

1990s 

After growing their staff enough to take over almost the entire building they were renting, in 1990 NI moved to a new building at 6504 Bridge Point Parkway, which the company purchased in 1991. The building, located along Lake Austin near the Loop 360 Bridge, became known as "Silicon Hills = Bridge Point."

NI received their first patent for LabVIEW in 1991. Later in the same year, they introduced Signal Conditioning eXtensions for Instrumentation (SCXI) to expand the signal-processing capabilities of the PC, and in 1992 LabVIEW was first released for Windows-based PCs and Unix workstations. To further assist their customers, NI also created the National Instruments Alliance Partner program, attracting a worldwide selection of third-party developers, systems integrators, and consultants who could extend the capabilities of the NI hardware and software.

With LabVIEW now available to a much larger audience, in 1993 the company reached the milestone of $100 million in annual sales. To attract C/C++ programmers, later that year NI introduced LabWindows/CVI. The following year an industrious employee began experiments with the relatively new World Wide Web and developed natinst.com, the company's very first web page.  As the company continued to grow, they began to run out of room in their approximately  campus. In 1994, NI broke ground on a new campus, located at a  site along North Mopac boulevard in northern Austin. By this time, NI had reached 1000 employees.

The new NI campus, which opened in 1998, was designed to be employee-friendly. It contains dedicated "play" areas, including basketball and volleyball courts, an employee gym, and a campus-wide walking trail. Each of the buildings on the campus are lined with windows and feature an open floor plan, so that the employees seated in cubicles throughout the building are never far from the sun and views of northwest Austin. Focusing on equality among the employees, even "Dr. T", as the employees call their CEO, sits in an open cubicle and does not have an assigned parking space.

Employees had been granted stock in the privately held company as part of their compensation packages. When the company chose to go public in 1995, over 300 current and former employees owned stock. The company is now listed on the NASDAQ exchange as NATI.

By the late 1990s, customers had begun using LabVIEW in industrial automation applications. With LabVIEW and the more advanced DAQ boards provided by the company, engineers could now replace expensive, fixed-function, vendor-defined instruments with a custom PC-based system that would acquire, analyze, and present data with added flexibility and a lower cost. With the company's acquisition of Georgetown Systems Lookout software, NI products were further incorporated into applications run on the factory-floor. By 1996, the company had reached $200 million in annual sales, and was named to Forbes magazine's 200 Best Small Companies list.

Over the next several years, the engineers at NI continued to stretch the boundaries of virtual instrumentation, releasing machine vision software and hardware, which allow cameras to act as sensors, and motion control hardware and software. NI also introduced the CompactPCI-based PXI, an open industry standard for modular measurement and automation, and NI TestStand, which provides for tracking high-volume manufacturing tests.

2000s 
User traffic and e-commerce rapidly improved after the company acquired the ni.com domain and began investing in web technologies to better highlight their products. The company quickly introduced online configuration tools to help customers decide which NI products would best interact to solve their problem. They introduced NI Developer Zone, which provides the end-user developers access to example programs, sample code, and development tips, as well as forums in which users and NI employees could help answer questions about the products.

In the 2000s, NI began exporting most of its manufacturing overseas by first opening its first international manufacturing plant in Debrecen, Hungary. This  plant helped to diversify the company's manufacturing capabilities, which had been centered at company headquarters in Austin. NI now manufactures nearly 90% of its production in Debrecen and has expanded several times in the last decade. In 2011, with a multimillion-dollar grant from the government, NI increased production in Debrecen by approximately 20%. With state-of-the-art automation processes, headcount increased by only 2%.

In 2002, the company dedicated the  Building C on their Mopac campus, which became the headquarters for the company's R&D operations. Upon completion of this building, the NI campus finally had enough capacity to move all Austin-based employees to a single location.

Following the company model of selling directly to customers, by 2006 NI had opened 21 sales offices in Europe and 12 offices in the Asia/Pacific region, as well as a multitude of offices in the Americas, Africa, and the Middle East.  Research and Development centers are located in the United States, Germany, India, Romania, China, Canada, and Malaysia.

2010s
In January 2013, National Instruments acquired all outstanding shares of Digilent Inc., which became a wholly owned subsidiary. Digilent was founded in 2000 by two Washington State University electrical engineering professors, Clint Cole and Gene Apperson and grew to become a multinational corporation in the engineering education sector, with sales of test and development products to thousands of universities. Digilent developed the open standard Pmod Interface.

2020s
On June 16, 2020, National Instruments announced that they were officially changing the company's name to "NI". On May 4, 2021, NI announced the acquisition of monoDrive, a provider of ultra-high fidelity simulation software for advanced driver-assistance systems (ADAS) and autonomous vehicle development. In March 2022, it was announced that NI had completed the acquisition of Heinzinger Automotive GmbH, the electronic vehicle systems business of Rosenheim-based Heinzinger electronic GmbH.

Products
National Instruments' engineering software includes:
 LabVIEW, a graphical development environment
 LabVIEW Communications System Design Suite, A design environment designed for rapid deployment of communication systems.
 LabWindows/CVI, an ANSI C programming environment
 Measurement Studio, a set of components for Microsoft Visual Studio
 NI TestStand, for test execution sequencing
 NI VeriStand for real-time test
 NI DIAdem for data management
 NI Multisim for circuit design
 NI Ultiboard for PCB design
 NI Vision Builder for Automated Inspection
 NI LabVIEW SignalExpress for data logging
 NI Switch Executive for switch management
 NI Requirements Gateway for requirements tracking

National Instruments' hardware platforms include:
 NI CompactRIO, programmable FPGA-based industrial controller
 NI roboRIO, a robotics controller used standard in the FIRST Robotics Competition
 NI CompactDAQ, data acquisition systems for USB and Ethernet
 PXI and PXIe Platforms, a modular instrumentation standard with more than 1,500 products
 STS, a production-ready ATE solution for RF, mixed-signal, and MEMS 
 NI ELVIS, a multi-instrument lab station for teaching technology

Groups

Electronics Workbench Group 
The National Instruments Electronics Workbench Group is responsible for creating the electronic circuit design software NI Multisim and NI Ultiboard, which was previously a Canada-based company that first produced MultiSIM, and integrated ULTIboard with it.

Interactive Image Technologies was founded in Toronto, Ontario by Joe Koenig, and specialized in producing educational movies and documentaries. When the government of Ontario needed an educational tool for teaching electronics in colleges, the company created a circuit simulator called Electronics Workbench. In 1996, Interactive Image Technologies appointed its vice president Roy Bryant to Chief Operating Officer to oversee day-to-day operations of the company and to grow the companies Electronic Design Automation (EDA) products. Bryant is credited with "overseeing the development and marketing of the company's Electronics Workbench EDA product". By 1999, Electronics Workbench was the most popular EDA in the world. In 1998 the company started a strategic partnership with another electronic design automation company named Ultimate Technology from Naarden, Netherlands who was the European market leader in printed circuit board design software, with their package ULTIboard. Like Electronics Workbench, founder James Post had focused heavily on the educational market and gained PR fame when he organized the distribution of 180,000 demo floppy disks via electronics magazines in Europe.

In 1999 the companies merged, and renamed itself after its most well known product, Electronics Workbench. Then the product line consisted of schematic capture and a simulation product named MultiSIM and the printed circuit board software called Ultiboard. Soon thereafter the combined product suite became worldwide leader in PC based computer-aided design.

In 2005 the company was acquired by National Instruments, and rebranded as National Instruments Electronics Workbench Group.

Community 
Beginning in 1995, National Instruments has held an annual developer conference in Austin, NIWeek. Engineers and scientists from around the world attend the week-long conference at the Austin Convention Center. Activities there center on technical sessions on the company's products as well as the underlying technologies, presented both by NI employees and external presenters. An exhibition hall allows selected industry integrators and suppliers to showcase their products, and various customers or university students also present papers on their work with NI tools.

See also 
 List of companies based in Austin, Texas
 Mechatronics

References

External links 
 
 NI US Patents

Electronics companies of the United States
Manufacturing companies based in Austin, Texas
Companies listed on the Nasdaq
Electronics companies established in 1976
Electronic test equipment manufacturers
1976 establishments in Texas